Ghost Towns in Hawaii

Hawaii County

Apua
Honuapo
Kaimū
Kalapana
Kapoho
Laupahoehoe
Mahukona
Waiakea

Honolulu County
Halstead Sugar Mill
Kawailoa 
Kualoa Sugar Mill
Waiale'e
Waialua Sugar Mill

Kauai County
Kekaha Sugar Mill
Koloa Sugar Company Mill
Mana
Lihue Sugar Plantation
Old Sugar Mill of Koloa

Kalawao County
Kalaupapa
Kalawao

Maui County
Halawa
Keomuku

References

External links

 
Hawaii
Ghost towns